The Archdiocese of Thyateira and Great Britain is an archdiocese of the Eastern Orthodox Church, part of the Ecumenical Patriarchate of Constantinople. Its present head is Archbishop Nikitas Loulias. Its jurisdiction covers those Orthodox Christians living in Great Britain, the Republic of Ireland, the Isle of Man, and the Channel Islands. The adherents are largely of Cypriot Greek descent, mainland Greek migrants and their descendants, and more recently native British converts along with a few Poles, Belarusians, and Ukrainians. It is also the largest Orthodox Archdiocese in the British Isles. The former archbishop, Gregorios, himself was a Cypriot whose ancestral village of Marathovounos, in the district of Famagusta, is occupied by the Turkish army.

Archdiocesan Administration 
The Archdiocese is organised around the archbishop whose cathedra is located at the Cathedral of Holy Wisdom (also known as Saint Sophia's) in London. It one of the various metropolis' of the Ecumenical Patriarchate, established as part of the large expansion of Orthodox Metropolia in Western Europe, such as with Austria, Belgium, France, Germany, Italy, Sweden and Switzerland. The archbishop is considered the 'Primus inter pares' of the various Orthodox ecclesial bodies in the United Kingdom. The archbishop, therefore sits at the head of the Pan-Orthodox Episcopal Assembly of the British Isles and Ireland. The headquarters of the Archdiocese is at Thyateira House, in the Bayswater district of London.

The first Metropolitan of the (then) Metropolis of Thyateira and Great Britain was Metropolitan Germanos Strinopoulos. The current Metropolitan Archbishop is Nikitas Loulias

History 
The first recorded organised Greek Orthodox community in England was established in 1670 by a group of 100 Greek refugees from Mani. There were also theologians, students, coffee shop owners, traders and sailors. Their priest was Daniel Boulgaris, who also seems to have taken the initiative to gain permission from the Anglican Bishop of London to build a permanent church for his growing flock. His efforts were boosted in 1676 by the arrival of the Archbishop of Samos, Joseph Georgerines, who had originally travelled to London to publish his Anthologion, "for the use of the Eastern Greek Church". Soon, the London authorities granted them permission to build a church. Georgerines then travelled around the country with his manservant, Dominikos Cratianas, to raise the necessary funds.

The church was inaugurated in 1677 in Soho and dedicated to the Panagia on what soon became Greek Street. However, the situation turned precarious when Dominicos Cratiana was taken to court by his master over the alleged disappearance of funds. Cratiana counteracted by accusing him of being a "Popish plotter".

The church was confiscated in 1684 and handed over to Huguenot refugees from France, much to the anger of the Greek Archbishop, who wrote and circulated a furious pamphlet which criticised this move and detailed how the English authorities had expropriated the community. He wrote that the community "never sold the said Church, nor received any sum for the building thereof". The church no longer stands but the dedicatory plaque that was embedded over the main entrance is now housed in the narthex of the Greek Orthodox Cathedral of St Sophia in Bayswater.

During the next 150 years, the community had to worship in the Imperial Russian Embassy. Finally, in 1837, an autonomous community was set up in Finsbury Park in London. The first new church was built in 1850, on London Street in the City. In 1877, the Church of St Sophia (the Holy Wisdom) was constructed in London to cope with the growing influx of Orthodox immigrants to the United Kingdom. By the outbreak of the First World War, large Orthodox communities in London, Manchester, Cardiff and Liverpool, each focused on its own church.

Metropolis of Thyateira and Great Britain (1922–1968) 
The issue of how these significant communities were to be governed was not resolved until 1922, when the Holy Synod of the Ecumenical Patriarchate, following the initiative of the Ecumenical Patriarch, Meletius IV, established a Metropolis to oversee both Central and Western Europe with its See in London, naming it ‘Metropolis of Thyateira and Great Britain’. The city of Thyateira, after which the Metropolis was named, was one of the seven Apostolic Churches mentioned in Saint John's Book of Revelation. The Ecumenical Patriarchate elected Metropolitan Germanos Strinopoulos as the first Hierarch of the newly-founded Metropolis. His long term in office (1922-1951) was marked by the founding of a large number of Greek Orthodox Communities both in Great Britain as well as in other countries in Western and Central Europe under the See of the Metropolis of Thyateira and Great Britain.

In 1951 the previous Metropolitan of Philadelphia, Athenagoras Kavvadas was elected Metropolitan of Thyateira and Great Britain. During his tenure he continued the pastoral and spiritual work of his predecessor, further contributing to the shaping of the historical, social and theological Greek-Orthodox presence in Great Britain and the rest of Western Europe.

On 10th December 1963, the then Metropolitan Athenagoras Kokkinakis was elected Metropolitan of Thyateira and Great Britain and on the 24th February 1968, the Metropolis of Thyateira became the Archdiocese of Thyateira of Great Britain, specifically in charge of the British Isles. Under his term of office, the development of the Archdiocese was impressive, despite the fact that the pastoral jurisdiction of the Archdiocese was restricted due to the loss of the Scandinavian Eparchies and of Iceland, as a result of the establishment by the Ecumenical Patriarchate of the Metropolises of France, Germany and Austria.

Archdiocese of Thyateira and Great Britain (1968-present) 
Archbishop Athenegoras embarked on a program of modernisation and the development of the Archdiocese included a series of reforms concerning the relationship of the Archdiocese to the other institutions of the Greek and Cypriot Diaspora in Great Britain, namely the organization of the educational projects of its Communities, the publication of journals (Orthodox Herald, the official pastoral publication), the election of new, efficient Bishops and the successful handling of the ‘deluge’ of refugees as a result of the invasion of the Turkish Army in Cyprus in 1974. Archbishop Athenagoras died on the 9th September 1979, in London.

The Holy Synod of the Ecumenical Patriarchate then appointed the previous Metropolitan of Axum (Ethiopia) under the Alexandrian Church, Methodios Fouiyas, to the Archdiocese in 1979. He had moved from the Alexandrian Church to the Ecumenical Patriarchate in order to do so. He continued the project of Archbishop Athenagoras until he was revoked by the Ecumenical Patriarchate in April 1988 and was given the title of Metropolitan of Pisidia. He died in Athens in 2006.

In April 1988, the Ecumenical Patriarchate elected Bishop of Tropaiou Gregorios Theocharous as the new Archbishop. Being well-informed in the affairs and realities of the Greek-Orthodox Diaspora due to his former service in Great Britain as Deacon, Priest, Archmandrite and Bishop, and armed with an enviable zeal for reform, the new Archbishop drastically transformed the Archdiocese, the Communities and its Schools. He served a lengthy tensure as Archbishop, holding the throne for thirty-one years. For reasons of prolonged age and fragile health, Archbishop Gregorios resigned and Nikitas Loulias was elected Archbishop of Thyateira and Great Britain by the Holy Synod of the Ecumenical Patriarchate, following the recommendation of Ecumenical Patriarch Bartholomew. His enthronement took place in the Cathedral of the Divine Wisdom in London on July 27, 2019.

Archbishops of Thyateira and Great Britain 
Several archbishops have served the Metropolis/Archdiocese since 1922 including:
 Germanos Strinopoulos (1922—1951)
 Athenagoras Kavadas (1951—1962)
 Athenagoras Kokkinakis (1963—1979)
 Methodios Fouiyas (1979—1988)
 Gregorios Theocharous (1988 - 2019)
Nikitas Loulias (2019–present)

Parishes and monasteries
 there are 114 parishes and monasteries in the UK and Ireland:

South West 
 SS Michael the Archangel & Piran, near Falmouth
 SS Demetrius & Nicetas, Plymouth
 St Andrew, Torquay
 St Andrew the Apostle, Weston-super-Mare
 SS Peter & Paul, Bristol
 Nativity of the Mother of God (Eastern Orthodox Church), Bristol
 St John of Kronstadt, Bath
 Community of St John Chrysostom, Gloucester
 St John the Forerunner, Salisbury
 Community of St Spyridon, Bournemouth
 Holy Prophet Elias, Exeter & Combe Martin

South East 
 Holy Trinity & Annunciation, Oxford
 SS Ambrose & Stylianos, Milton Keynes
 Community of St Phanourius, Aylesbury
 Community of St Gregory the Theologian, Beaconsfield
 Prophet Elias, Reading
 St Andrew the Apostle, Windsor
 St Nicholas, Southampton
 Community of Portsmouth
 Holy Trinity, Brighton
 St Mary Magdalene, St Leonards-on-Sea
 SS Panteleimon & Theodore, Eastbourne
 Annunciation of the Mother of God, Maidstone
 SS Mark & Fotini, Folkestone
 Archangel Michael, Margate

London

Central London 
Cathedral & Metropolitical Church of St Sophia, Bayswater 
Cathedral of St Andrew, Kentish Town 
Cathedral of All Saints, Camden Town 
Archdiocesan Chapel of the Annunciation of the Mother of God, Bayswater

North London 
Cathedral of the Dormition of the Mother of God, Wood Green 
Cathedral of the Holy Cross & St Michael, Golders Green 
SS Cosmas & Damian, NW5 1LN 
SS Anthony the Great & John the Baptist, Islington 
St Barnabas, Wood Green 
St Demetrius, Lower Edmonton, N9 0LP 
St John the Baptist, Hornsey 
St Katherine, Friern Barnet 
SS Panteleimon & Paraskevi, Harrow 
Community of SS Raphael, Nicholas & Irene of Lesbos (Mytiline), Enfield North & District
Chapel of the Resurrection, Muswell Hill

South London 
Cathedral of the Nativity of the Mother of God, Camberwell 
SS Constantine & Helen, Upper Norwood 
St Nectarius, SW11 5QR 
St George, Kingston-upon-Thames 
Christ the Saviour, Welling

East London 
SS Eleutherius, Anthia & Luke the Evangelist, Leyton 
St John the Theologian, E8 3RD 
SS Lazarus & Andrew the Apostle, Forest Gate

West London 
Cathedral of St Nicholas, Shepherds Bush

East of England 
St Mamas, Bedford 
St Charalambos, Luton 
The Twelve Apostles, Brookmans Park 
SS Athanasius & Clement, Cambridge 
Mother of God, Norwich 
Pan-Orthodox Chapel of Life-Receiving Source, Walsingham 
St Spyridon, Great Yarmouth 
Community of SS Cosmas & Damian, Ipswich 
Community of St Sophia & Her Three Daughters, Bishop's Stortford 
Patriarchal Stavropegic Monastery of St. John the Baptist, Essex 
SS Barbara, Phanourius & Paul, Southend-on-Sea

West Midlands 
Community of SS Stephen & Thecla, Hereford
Community of Oswestry
Holy Fathers of Nicaea & St John the Baptist, Shrewsbury
Community of the Holy Fathers of Nicaea, Telford
Cathedral of the Dormition of the Mother of God & St Andrew, Birmingham
Holy Trinity & St Luke, Birmingham
Nativity of the Mother of God, Walsall
The Holy Transfiguration, Coventry
Ascension of the Lord, Rugby
SS Mary & Marina, Stoke-on-Trent

East Midlands 
St Neophytos, Northampton 
Cathedral of SS Nicholas & Xenophon, Leicester 
Virgin Mary Eleousa, Nottingham 
SS Cyril & Methodius, Mansfield 
St Basil the Great & Saint Paisios, Lincoln

North West 
St Barbara, Chester 
St Nicholas, Toxteth
Annunciation of the Mother of God, Manchester
St Nicholas, Blackley
Community of the Holy Apostles, Leyland
Community of St Simon the Zealot, Dalton-in-Furness
Community of St Bega, St Mungo, & St Herbert, Braithwaite

Yorkshire and the Humber 
 Annunciation of the Mother of God, Sheffield
 Three Hierarchs, Leeds
 Community of St Constantine the Great, York

North East 
 Annunciation of the Mother of God, Middlesbrough
 Community of SS Cuthbert & Bede, Durham
 St Anthony, Newcastle-upon-Tyne

Wales 
 St Nicholas, Cardiff
 Three Hierarchs, Lampeter
www.lampeterorthodox.org.uk
 Community of Rhuddlan

Scotland 
Cathedral of St Luke, Glasgow
Chapel of St Andrew, Edinburgh
Chapel of St John the Baptist, Ardross Castle
Community of Dundee
Community of St Andrews
Community of Perth
Oratory of the Mother of God & St Cumein, Fort Augustus
Community of the Highlands, Inverness
Community of St Matthew the Apostle, Aberdeen

Channel Islands 
 Community of SS Simon, Andrew the Apostle & Philon, Jersey
 Community of All Saints, Guernsey

Ireland 
 Community of the Annunciation, Dublin
See also Category:Greek Orthodox churches in the United Kingdom

References

Bibliography

External links

 

Eastern Orthodox dioceses in the United Kingdom
Archdiocese of Thyateira and Great Britain
Eastern Orthodoxy in the Republic of Ireland
Thyateira
Dioceses established in the 20th century
Christian organizations established in 1922
1922 establishments in England